Josie Cichockyj (9 December 1964 – 2 December 2014) was a British wheelchair athlete. Born in Huddersfield, she competed in the London Marathon women's wheelchair race for a number of years, finishing as runner-up to Kay McShane and Karen Davidson, before winning the 1989 race. Josie won further Marathons including the Leeds, Gloucester, Ottawa and Brussels Marathons. Plus several half Marathons including Great North Run and Reading.

Career
Cichockyj took part in the Summer Paralympics, competing in wheelchair racing at the 1984 Games and in wheelchair basketball at the 1988 Games. Josie held every British Track Record from 100m through to 5,000m breaking 28 British Records.  The highlight of her track career was breaking the 5,000m World Track record in addition to silver medals at European Track Championships in Belgium and Austria.

Cichockyj was Great Britain Wheelchair Basketball Captain, 1989-1992 and also acted as Vice captain for several years. She competed in the 1988 Paralympics in Seoul, South Korea and the 1996 Paralympics in Atlanta, USA, gaining 6th Position (highest placed British team).  She won bronze medals in the 1995 European Championships in Delden, Holland, and the 1997 championships in Madrid, Spain, 1997.  Josie competed in World Championships including Sydney, Australia in 1998.

During the time Josie Cichockyj was competing at basketball she also competed in table tennis and became a National Champion and became a ranked tennis player playing on the ATP tour ITF Tennis . She was also a ranked tennis player on the ATP World Wheelchair Tennis Tour

Cichockyj died on 2 December 2014 due to cancer.

Tennis

LTA National Doubles Winner
LTA National Singles Runner Up
NW of England Tournament, Division Winner
New York Indoor Tennis Championships, Singles Division Winner
Dallas Tennis Championships, Singles Division Winner
Israel Open Tennis Championships, Singles Division Winner

Table Tennis

1984 Paralympic selection
DSE National Singles Winner
DSE Doubles Single Winner
BTTAD Singles Winner

Awards

Alumni Fellowship Award Bolton University for Services to Sport
North West Achievement Award in recognition of work with Disabled People
Nominated Cheshire Women of the Year 1996
Nominated North of England YMCA Volunteer Award 1996
Great Britain Wheelchair Basketball Association Personality of the Year 1989
Nominated a finalist at the Winning Women Awards Ceremony 2001
DSE National Achievement Award for Services to Table Tennis

References

External links
 
 

1964 births
2014 deaths
English female wheelchair racers
British women's wheelchair basketball players
Paralympic athletes of Great Britain
Athletes (track and field) at the 1984 Summer Paralympics
Paralympic wheelchair basketball players of Great Britain
Wheelchair basketball players at the 1984 Summer Paralympics
Wheelchair basketball players at the 1988 Summer Paralympics
Wheelchair basketball players at the 1996 Summer Paralympics
Wheelchair category Paralympic competitors
Paralympic wheelchair racers
People with spina bifida
Sportspeople from Huddersfield
Deaths from cancer in England